Gaping Gill (also known as Gaping Ghyll) is a natural cave in North Yorkshire, England. After falling through one of the largest known underground chambers in Britain, the water disappears into the bouldery floor and eventually resurges adjacent to Ingleborough Cave.

The shaft was the deepest known in Britain, until Titan in Derbyshire was discovered in 1999.  Gaping Gill still retains the records for the highest unbroken waterfall in England and the largest underground chamber naturally open to the surface.

Features

Due to the number of entrances which connect into the cave, many different routes through and around the system are possible.  Other entrances include Jib Tunnel, Disappointment Pot, Stream Passage Pot, Bar Pot, Hensler's Pot, Corky's Pot, Rat Hole, and Flood Entrance Pot.

The Bradford Pothole Club around Whitsun May Bank Holiday, and the Craven Pothole Club around August Bank Holiday, each set up a winch above the shaft to provide a ride to the bottom and back out again for any member of the public who pays a fee.

A detailed 3D model of the chamber has been created using an industrial laser rangefinder which showed that its volume is comparable to the size of York Minster.

History of exploration

Descents 
The first recorded attempted descent was by John Birkbeck in 1842 who reached a ledge approximately  down the shaft which bears his name. The first complete descent was achieved by Édouard-Alfred Martel in 1895.

Hensler's Crawl and Master Cave 
On 25 July 1937 Eric Hensler (1907–1991) explored a low passage leading off Booth-Parsons crawl, finding it to be unexplored. This was later named Hensler's Crawl and was also found to lead into Hensler's Master Cave.

Since 1937 
In 1983 members of the Cave Diving Group made the underwater connection into Ingleborough Cave.

An extreme rock-climb (graded E3, 5c) is possible up the main shaft which requires very dry conditions.  It was first pioneered in 1972 with ten points of aid.  The first free ascent was made in 1988.

See also 

 Caving in the United Kingdom
List of caves in the United Kingdom

References

Sources

External links

Map of all the entrances into the Gaping Gill system
Website that includes details of several caving routes in Gaping Gill and Ingleborough Cave
Extract from the documentary film "Journey into Darkness" hr/ARTE 1995
Video of Eric Hensler recounting his discovery of Hensler's Crawl

Limestone caves
Caves of North Yorkshire
Subterranean waterfalls
Waterfalls of England